Ciamik is a colloquial Indonesian word derived from Chinese (Hokkien). It means "extraordinarily good". It originally referred to a person, but now is used to describe just about anything that is good. The original phrase in Hokkien language is "Cia ha mi?", which means literally "What did you eat?" or "What have you been eating?".

Usage examples:
"That was a great serve. Cia ha mi this morning?". "You look so fresh. Cia ha mi?"

Later Chinese generations and native Indonesians who do not speak Hokkien eventually corrupt the phrase to become "ciami". Influenced by Javanese, it gained the silent "k" ending over time resulting the phrase to be pronounced as "ciami' " with a glottal stop.

Indonesian words and phrases